The 2003 Generali Ladies Linz is the 2003 Tier II WTA Tour tournament of the annually-held Generali Ladies Linz tennis tournament. It was the 17th edition of the tournament and was held from October 23–30, 2003 at the TipsArena Linz. Ai Sugiyama won the singles title.

Points and prize money

Point distribution

Prize money

* per team

Singles main draw entrants

Seeds 

Rankings are as of 10 October 2003.

Other entrants 
The following players received wildcards into the singles main draw:
  Sybille Bammer
  Karolina Šprem
  Barbara Schett

The following players received entry from the qualifying draw:
  Ľudmila Cervanová
  Sonya Jeyaseelan
  Klára Koukalová
  Maja Matevžič

Withdrawals 

  Justine Henin-Hardenne → replaced by  Marion Bartoli
  Conchita Martínez → replaced by  Marie-Gaïané Mikaelian
  Serena Williams → replaced by  Alexandra Stevenson

Doubles main draw entrants

Seeds 

Rankings are as of 10 October 2003

Other entrants
The following pair received wildcards into the doubles main draw:
  Verena Amesbauer /  Daniela Kix

Finals

Singles

 Ai Sugiyama defeated  Nadia Petrova, 7–5, 6–4.
 It was Sugiyama's 5th WTA singles title, and second title of the year.

Doubles

 Liezel Huber /  Ai Sugiyama defeated  Marion Bartoli /  Silvia Farina Elia, 6–2, 7–6(8–6).
 It was Huber's 9th WTA doubles title, and fifth of the year. It was Sugiyama's 28th WTA doubles title, and eighth of the year. This was the first and only doubles titles they won together as a pair.

References

Generali Ladies Linz
Linz Open
Generali Ladies Linz
Generali Ladies Linz
Generali